Dyirringañ, also spelt Dyirringany and Djiringanj, is an Australian Aboriginal language of the Yuin people of New South Wales.

It is not listed in Bowern (2011), but the people are ethnically Yuin. The only attestation of the language are manuscripts and a grammar  dating from 1902. It is sometimes classified with Thawa as a dialect of Southern Coastal Yuin.

Bermagui Public School, a primary school in Bermagui, has taught local Aboriginal languages including Djiringanj and the Dhurga language, along with the associated cultures, since 2019.

References

External links 
 Selected bibliography of material on the Djirringany / Dyirringany language and people held in the AIATSIS Library, at the Australian Institute of Aboriginal and Torres Strait Islander Studies (Also here.)

Tharawal languages
Extinct languages of New South Wales